The Casa de los Ponce de León is a historic house in San Germán, Puerto Rico. It is possibly the oldest residence in use in Puerto Rico.  Its most famous resident was the poet Lola Rodriguez Ponce de León.

The house was listed on the U.S. National Register of Historic Places in 1983.

See also

National Register of Historic Places listings in western Puerto Rico
List of the oldest buildings in Puerto Rico

Notes

References

External links
Summary sheet from the Puerto Rico State Historic Preservation Office 

Buildings and structures in San Germán, Puerto Rico
León
Historic district contributing properties in Puerto Rico
Spanish Colonial architecture in Puerto Rico
San Germán, Puerto Rico